Alessandro Baronti (born 4 June 1967) is an Italian former professional racing cyclist. He rode in two editions of the Giro d'Italia and the Tour de France, notably winning a stage of the 1997 Giro d'Italia. He also won the Roma Maxima the same year.

Major results

1988
 5th Gran Premio della Liberazione
1991
 3rd GP Industrie del Marmo
1993
 1st GP Industrie del Marmo
 4th Gran Premio della Liberazione
1994
 1st Circuito Belvedere
 2nd GP Industrie del Marmo
1996
 3nd Giro della Provincia di reggio Calabria
 3rd Gran Premio Città di Camaiore
 5th Firenze–Pistoia
 6th Grand Prix de Suisse
 9th Coppa Bernocchi
 9th Giro dell'Etna
1997
 1st Roma Maxima
 1st Stage 15 Giro d'Italia
 3rd Coppa Placci
 3rd Memorial Gastone Nencini
 4th Giro di Romagna
1998
 2nd Trofeo Melinda
 9th Giro di Toscana
1999
 1st GP Industria & Commercio di Prato
 1st Giro della Provincia di Siracusa
2000
 1st Giro d'Oro

References

External links
 

1967 births
Living people
Italian male cyclists
Cyclists from Florence